SLC Super Provincial Twenty20, earlier known as SLC Inter-Provincial Twenty20, was a Twenty20 domestic Cricket competition in Sri Lanka held by Sri Lanka Cricket. It was one of three Inter-Provincial Cricket tournaments. Sri Lanka used to have a Twenty20 Tournament which was conducted from 2004 to 2008 and was held between the clubs in Sri Lanka. From 2008 to 2011 the Inter-Provincial Twenty20 became the mainstream domestic Twenty20 competition in Sri Lanka. Wayamba elevens has been in all finals and won the first three tournaments, while Ruhuna won the final tournament. It was replaced by the Sri Lanka Premier League in 2012, but later revived in 2016, as Super Fours Provincial T20 Tournament. but it was replaced by the SLC T20 League.

History

Inaugural season

Wayamba elevens won the first Inter-Provincial Twenty20 tournament, but they were not invited to the 2008 Champions League Twenty20 which included only teams from India, South Africa, Australia, England and Pakistan, but the tournament was ultimately cancelled due to The Attacks of 26/11 in Mumbai, India.

Second season

Wayamba elevens won their second Inter-Provincial Twenty20 tournament and qualified for the 2009 Champions League Twenty20.

Third season

Wayamba elevens won their third Inter-Provincial Twenty20 tournament and qualified for the 2010 Champions League Twenty20.

Fourth season

This season was the first one to have a different winner, other than Wayamba Elevens who had won all the previous 3 tournaments. Ruhuna Elevens won the tournament and qualified for CLT20 to be held in India. The fourth season of the Inter-Provincial Twenty20 was to be replaced by the Sri Lankan Premier League. There were franchise teams along with the inclusion of two extra provinces and the tournament was to allow international players to play, however the 2011 Sri Lanka Premier League was postponed due to allegations of corruption and incompetence by Sri Lanka Cricket. The Board of Control for Cricket in India had also decided not to allow Indian players to play in the tournament which later became the primary cause. Ruhuna elevens win their first Inter-Provincial Twenty20 tournament and qualifies for the qualifying stage of the 2011 Champions League Twenty20.

Also, this was supposed to be the last tournament before SLPL replaced it in 2012, but due to cancellation of SLPL, it will happen for a final time in 2013.

Fifth season

After the cancellation of 2013 Sri Lanka Premier League due to all eight franchises refusing to pay their tournament fee, and also failed to guarantee player payments, Sri Lanka Cricket announced that the Super Fours Provincial T20 Tournament would replace SLPL for that year. The primary concern was to have a team crowned champion and hand them a trip to the qualifiers of CLT20 in India to represent Sri Lanka. This tournament, however, would be 4-team tournament lasting for only 7 matches which is the lowest of all the seasons. This is also the first time that Wayamba Elevens will not be part of the tournament. It will begin on 10 August and will last up to 17 August.
All seven matches in the league will take place at the R Premadasa Stadium in Colombo
All the teams have been renamed. Angelo Mathews will captain the Basnahira Greens, Dinesh Chandimal the Uthura Yellows, Lahiru Thirimanne the Kandurata Maroons and Lasith Malinga will lead the Ruhuna Reds. Each team plays each other once, before the two top sides qualify for the final.

Sixth season

The sixth and final season of Inter-Provincial Twenty20, was named Super T20 Provincial Tournament by Sri Lanka Cricket. The tournament, comprises 5-teams with new names and logos. The teams, however, categorized according to the district and not with the province, Hambantota Troopers, Colombo Commandos, Galle Guardians, Kurunegala Warriors and Kandy Crusaders. All matches were played in R. Premadasa Stadium. Colombo Commandos won the tournament.

Teams
Teams in the Inter-Provincial Twenty20 were based around representation of the Provinces of Sri Lanka. The first three tournaments hosted six teams including either a schools representative team or a Sri Lanka Cricket representative team. However the fourth season only hosted five teams all representing a province as well as a Combined Provinces team, for those provinces that were not represented by one team and in the last season there were even lesser teams (4).

Tournament history

Competition placings

See also
 Twenty20 Tournament

References

External links
 Facebook page

Sri Lankan domestic cricket competitions
 
Recurring sporting events established in 2008
Twenty20 cricket leagues

mr:इंटर प्रोव्हिंशियल २०-२०